The Cypress of Abarkuh ( Sarv-e Abarkuh), also called the Zoroastrian Sarv, is a Persian cypress (Cupressus sempervirens) tree in Abarkuh in Yazd Province of Iran. It is estimated to be over four millennia old and is likely the oldest or second-oldest living lifeform in Asia.

The exact age of the tree has been difficult to determine, but it is estimated to be between 4000 and 5000 years old. Favorable natural conditions of its location have been credited as the main reason for the tree's longevity.

There is a legend about the tree, which says the tree was first planted by Zoroaster. It is said that Zoroaster left to spread his teachings to an Iranian city towards Balkh and met Shah Vishtaspa. He stopped at Abarkuh and supposedly planted this tree.

Gallery

See also
 List of oldest trees
 List of individual trees
 Cypress of Kashmar
 Yaldā Night

References

Individual conifers
Yazd Province
Tourist attractions in Yazd Province
Individual trees in Iran
Oldest trees